Mark Driscoll (born February 3, 1959) is an American television producer and writer. He attended Boston Latin School and took a post graduate year at the Phillips Exeter Academy. Driscoll graduated from Harvard University in 1982; during his time there he was a member of the Harvard Lampoon. He shared a Primetime Emmy Award for his writing on the sitcom Ellen for the episode "The Puppy Episode".

Driscoll's other television credits include Married... with Children, Suddenly Susan, According to Jim, Hope & Faith and 90210. He is currently working on Grey's Anatomy.

References

External links

1959 births
Television producers from Massachusetts
American television writers
American male television writers
Primetime Emmy Award winners
The Harvard Lampoon alumni
Living people
Writers from Boston
Screenwriters from Massachusetts